Jeff Noon (born 1957 in Droylsden, Lancashire, England) is a British novelist, short story writer and playwright whose works make use of word play and fantasy. Noon's speculative fiction books have ties to the works of writers such as Lewis Carroll and Jorge Luis Borges. Prior to his relocation in 2000 to Brighton, Noon set most of his stories in some version of his native city of Manchester.

Novels
Noon's first four novels, which share ongoing characters and settings, are commonly referred to as the 'Vurt series' (after the first novel).
Although the fictional chronology leads from Automated Alice to Nymphomation to Vurt to Pollen, the books were originally published as Vurt (1993), Pollen (1995), Automated Alice (1996), and Nymphomation (1997). (Automated Alice connects the series to the fictional world of Lewis Carroll), serving as a 'trequel'  to Carroll's Alice's Adventures in Wonderland and Through the Looking-Glass )

Vurt (1993)

Vurt tells the story of Scribble and his "gang" the Stash Riders as they search for his missing sister Desdemona. Vurt refers to a drug/shared alternate reality that is accessed by sucking on colour-coded feathers. Through some (never explained) mechanism, the dreams, mythology, and imaginings of humanity achieved objective reality in the Vurt and became "real". The book won the 1994 Arthur C. Clarke Award. There is a Vurt film in the works, but as of the date of this writing, Jeff Noon has stated on his public website that "... all has gone silent at the moment. Don’t hold your breath."

Pollen (1995)

Pollen is the sequel to Vurt and concerns the ongoing struggle between the real world and the  world. When concerning the "" world, some references to Greek mythology are noticeable, including Persephone and Demeter, the river Styx and Charon, and Hades (portrayed by the character John Barleycorn).

Automated Alice (1996)

Noon describes Automated Alice as a "trequel" - it is a companion piece of sorts to Lewis Carroll's books Alice's Adventures in Wonderland and Through the Looking-Glass. The novella follows Alice's journey to a future Manchester populated by Newmonians, Civil Serpents and a vanishing cat named Quark.

They are mainly hybrids of animals and humans, but also of other random items such as kitchen sinks and pianos.

The civil serpents (a play-on-words of the job 'civil servant') are trying to control everything that happens in the future, and try to stop randomness. The 'Supreme Serpent' is the controller of the serpents, and hints at the fact that he is Satan himself.
The writing style of Noon is very similar to that of Lewis Carroll, who Noon constantly refers back to during the novel.

There are also references to popular musical figures, with two notable characters. Firstly, James Marshall Hentrails, a sculpture made of rubbish, and who contains the insides (entrails) of a hen. This character is obviously a reference to Jimi Hendrix. The character also sings a song while playing the guitar. The song is titled 'Little Miss Bonkers', a reference to 'Little Miss Strange' by Hendrix.

Secondly, the character of Long Distance Davis, who Alice meets in a police cell, is a reference to jazz musician and trumpet player Miles Davis.

Nymphomation (1997)

Nymphomation is the prequel to Vurt. Nymphomation primarily tells the story of a lottery in Manchester involving dominos and a group attempting to crack the secrets of that lottery, but it also sets the background for much of the mythology found in the previous three books.

Pixel Juice (1998)
Pixel Juice is a collection of fifty short stories.

Needle in the Groove (2000)

Needle in the Groove follows Elliot Hill, a bass player and ex-junkie trudging the pub-rock circuit, who is invited to join a new band: fusing DJ artistry, voice and rhythm section, the group's hypnotic groove creation is augmented by a startling new recording technology. The band seems bound for success - until one of them vanishes. Elliot's subsequent search draws him into a secret history of music that stretches back forty years and into his own past.
Jeff Noon and David Toop also released a CD, Needle in the Groove: if music were a drug, where would it take you, on Sulphur Records in the same year.

Cobralingus (2001)
Cobralingus sits apart from Noon's other published works. It is part anthology of poems and part instructional textbook for Noon's style of poetry. In it, he details his regimented methods for the creation of poetic text by a style of word play which lends its name to the title. Also included are various exemplars of this style.

The Engine begins with Noon using an existing text and then applying different 'filter gates' that edit the text into something new. Examples of these gates include 'enhance' which creates elements of beauty in the text, and 'ghost edit'; this kills the text and calls up a ghost to haunt the text.

The Codex edition of the book was illustrated by Daniel Allington and has an introduction by Michael Bracewell, explaining the Cobralingus Engine.

Falling out of Cars  (2002)
Falling out of Cars is a road novel set in a near-future world where information-based civilization is falling apart. It follows the journey of Marlene, Henderson, and Peacock as they drive around England on a mission to gather fragments of a mirror that may be at the heart of the world's affliction. Falling out of Cars is the record Marlene keeps - or tries to keep - of her quest to flee from her past. Despite her daily dose of Lucidity, Marlene is gradually succumbing to the malady, and it gets harder and harder to distinguish dream from reality, hallucinations from events.

217 Babel Street (2008)

217 Babel Street was a collaborative project between four authors, Susanna Jones, Alison MacLeod, William Shaw and Noon. Only published online, this collection of short stories is set in a fictional British apartment building and features stories about the lives of each inhabitant, to which each author contributed. No longer available online.

Channel SK1N (2012)

Channel SK1N follows popstar Nola Blue on a journey of transformation as she begins to pick up signals on her skin. It was published as a DRM-free ebook.

Bibliography

Novels and novellas

Vurt series
 Vurt (1993), 
 Pollen (1995), 
 Automated Alice (1996), 
 Nymphomation (1997),

Nyquist Mysteries
 A Man of Shadows (2017), 
 The Body Library (2018), 
 Creeping Jenny (2020), 
 Within Without (2021),

Others
 Needle in the Groove (2000), 
 Falling Out of Cars (2002), 
 Channel SK1N (2012), ASIN: B008RZD9ZI
 Slow Motion Ghosts (2019),

Short fiction collections
 Pixel Juice (1998), 
 Cobralingus (2001), 
 Mappalujo (2002) - co-written with Steve Beard, currently only available online
 217 Babel Street (2008) - co-written with Susanna Jones, Alison MacLeod and William Shaw, originally only available online, now no longer available

Plays
 Woundings (1986), 
 Vurt - The Theatre Remix (May 2000- the show ran for three weeks)
 Somewhere The Shadow (May 2001- the show ran from Thursday 3 May - Saturday 26 May)
 The Modernists (June 2003- the show ran from Wednesday 11 June - Saturday 21 June )

Radio work
 Dead Code - Ghosts of the Digital Age (BBC Radio 3, 2005) - incidental music by The Durutti Column

Film
 Woundings (based on the play), known as Brand New World (USA) (1998)

Reported works in progress 

A film adaptation of Creeping Zero was expected to go into production in 2012.  It may come to screens sometime in the future. The feature was based on the short story of the same name published in Pixel Juice. The film was to be directed by Billy O' Brien (director and writer of Isolation (film))

On 28 August 2011, Noon began a Twitter account where he posts what he has described as "Micro Spores" from the Twitter ID @jeffnoon.

Jeff also publishes "microfictions" set in Sparkletown under the pseudonym @temp_user9.

External links
 Micro Spores - Official Microspores project site.
 The Ghost On The B-Side - Jeff Noon's Remixing Narrative Manual.
 Guardian Books Podcast: Science Fiction Now and Tomorrow - Jeff Noon on The Guardian Books podcast, Jan 2012.
 What The Hell Ever Happened To... Jeff Noon? - An update on Jeff's current projects as of November 2011 from the author himself.
 Sam Leith's Top 10 Alternative Realities: The Guardian. - Noon in The Guardian's Top 10 Alternative Realities.
 Interview with Jeff surrounding Channel SK1N release, London Calling.
 Spike Magazine link collection for Jeff Noon
 The Modern Word: Jeff Noon–An introduction to Jeff Noon and his works
 Mappalujo–A writing game devised by Steve Beard and Jeff Noon
 Language is a Virus - Cobralingus Engine - Metamorphiction Process by Jeff Noon
 Origins of a Dub Fiction - by Jeff Noon
 Radio interview of Jeff Noon on Bookworm, April, 1996

1957 births
English male novelists
English science fiction writers
Living people
People from Droylsden
Postmodern writers
Weird fiction writers